Parc 1 is a complex of buildings in Yeouido, Seoul, South Korea. It stands  and contain 69 floors. Construction stopped in 2011 but resumed in early 2017.

History
Parc1 is a US$1.5-billion shopping/hotel/office complex realized by Skylan Properties Korea Ltd., a foreign-invested property development and management services group with offices in Seoul, Beijing and Kuala Lumpur. Morgan Stanley, a global investment bank, was engaged as the financial advisor to arrange financing for the project.

Parc1 was the current Tongil Parking Lot site, a 46,465 square metre plot set between financial and residential districts and bordering Yeouido Park.

Designed by architect Lord Richard Rogers, chief architectural advisor to the mayor of London, the central structure will be a six-story glass mall, offering space for 400 stores.

Structures
Tower I
Tower II
The Hyundai Seoul
Fairmont Ambassador Seoul

Notable tenants
NH Investment & Securities
LG Energy Solution

See also
List of tallest buildings in Seoul
List of tallest buildings in South Korea

References

External links

Office buildings completed in 2020
Skyscraper office buildings in Seoul
Yeouido
Richard Rogers buildings
2020 establishments in South Korea
Buildings and structures in Yeongdeungpo District